Nordøyvegen is a road that connect the northern islands of Ålesund (formerly in Haram Municipality and Sandøy Municipality) to the mainland in Møre og Romsdal county, Norway. It provides a faster, ferry-free connection to the mainland for the approximately 3,000 residents of the islands. The road is partly financed by a toll station at the Lepsøy, as of 2022 costing 219 NOK per direction for cars.

The project includes crossing four fjords with tunnels and bridges and upgrading and re-routing roads on the islands to meet national standards. A total of seven islands is connected to the mainland using two existing bridges and by building three new bridges, a causeway using fill, and three undersea tunnels.  The islands, from north to south, are Finnøya, Harøya, Fjørtofta, Skuløya, Haramsøya, Hestøya, and Lepsøya. The entire connection opened on 27 August 2022. The new construction includes:
The Lepsøy Bridge, Lauvøy Bridge, and Hamnaskjersund Bridge connects the mainland to the island of Lepsøya and to the small island of Hestøya. A roundabout is built part-way between the mainland and the two islands. This connection opened for public traffic on 18 december 2021.
Harøya was already connected to the island of Finnøya by a bridge.

References

External links
https://www.mrfylke.no/nordoyvegen

Road bridges in Møre og Romsdal
Road tunnels in Møre og Romsdal